Jaganathpur  Assembly constituency   is an assembly constituency in  the Indian state of Jharkhand.

Members of Assembly 

 1977: Barju Hansda, Janata Party
 1985: Ankura Ho Doreiburu, Indian National Congress
 1990: Mangal Singh Lamay, Janata Dal
 1995: Mangal Singh Bobonga, Janata Dal
 2000: Madhu Koda, Bharatiya Janata Party
 2005: Madhu Koda, Independent
 2009: Geeta Koda, Jai Bharat Samanta Party
 2014: Geeta Koda, Jai Bharat Samanta Party
2019: Sona Ram Sinku, Indian National Congress

Election Results

2019

See also
Vidhan Sabha
List of states of India by type of legislature

References

Assembly constituencies of Jharkhand